Dead Oceans is an American independent record label formed in 2007 and based in Bloomington, Indiana, with offices in New York, Los Angeles, Chicago, Austin, London, Paris, Amsterdam, and Berlin. Dead Oceans is part of Secretly Group, which also includes labels Secretly Canadian and Jagjaguwar and a music publisher, Secretly Publishing, that publishes artists, writers, filmmakers, producers, and comedians.

History
Phil Waldorf, a Virginia native with a teenage love of skateboarding and punk rock seven-inch records, attended college in Athens, Georgia, where he was music director for the college radio station, WUOG. In Athens, Waldorf came to know future indie bands Neutral Milk Hotel and Olivia Tremor Control in their formative years, going to early house shows before both bands rose to underground fame.

In 1998, Waldorf moved to New York City when he was hired by Other Music, a record store. He also began managing an indie label, Misra Records. 

Waldorf became friends with Chris Swanson and they decided to start a label together. Swanson suggested the name Dead Oceans, from the lyrics of Bob Dylan's “A Hard Rain’s a-Gonna Fall” (1962):

“I’ve been out in front of a dozen dead oceans

I’ve been ten thousand miles in the mouth of a graveyard

And it’s a hard, and it’s a hard, it’s a hard, and it’s a hard

And it’s a hard rain’s a-gonna fall.” 

In 2007, Waldorf started Dead Oceans with Chris Swanson, his brother Ben Swanson, Darius Van Arman, and Jonathan Cargill of Secretly Canadian and Jagjaguwar. The addition of Dead Oceans to Secretly Canadian and Jagjaguwar's partnership led to the formation of Secretly Group.

Some of the label's earliest releases include Phosphorescent's Pride, Dirty Projectors' Rise Above, and Akron/Family's Set ‘Em Wild, Set ‘Em Free, ranging from folk to art punk to groove-y rock. Dead Oceans has published Julianna Barwick, Mitski, Phoebe Bridgers, Japanese Breakfast, Ryley Walker, The Tallest Man on Earth, Kevin Morby, Marlon Williams, and many others.

In 2015, Secretly Group began a partnership with The Numero Group as well.

In 2017, the label released shoegaze band Slowdive’s first album in 22 years.

In 2018, Dead Oceans was listed as #7 on Paste magazine's top-10 record labels of 2018. Jagjaguwar was listed as #4 and Secretly Canadian was listed as #8.

Artists

 A Place to Bury Strangers 
 Akron/Family
 Alex Lahey
 Bear in Heaven
 Better Oblivion Community Center
 Bill Fay
 Bishop Allen
 Blackout Beach
 Bleached
 Bowerbirds
 Brazos
 Bright Eyes
 Califone
 Citay
 Destroyer
 Dirty Projectors
 Dub Thompson 
 Durand Jones & The Indications
 Evangelicals
 Fenne Lily
 Frog Eyes 
 Gauntlet Hair
 Greylag
 Japanese Breakfast
 John Vanderslice
 Julianna Barwick
 Kane Strang
 Kevin Morby
 Khruangbin
 Lump
 Mark McGuire
 Marlon Williams
 Mitski
 Mt. St. Helens Vietnam Band
 Night Beds
 Nurses
 On Fillmore
 Phoebe Bridgers
 Phosphorescent
 Ryley Walker
 Shame
 Sloppy Jane
 Slowdive
 Strand of Oaks
 Sun Airway
 The Donkeys
 The Explorers Club
 The Good Ones
 The Luyas
 The Tallest Man on Earth
 These Are Powers
 Tom Rogerson
 Toro y Moi
 White Hinterland

Notable honors and awards

GRAMMY AWARDS (US/GLOBAL)
2022, Japanese Breakfast, 'Jubilee' - Best Alternative Music Album (nominated)
2021, Phoebe Bridgers - Best New Artist (nominated)
2021, Phoebe Bridgers, ‘Punisher’ - Best Alternative Music Album (nominated)
2021, Phoebe Bridgers, ‘Kyoto’ - Best Rock Performance (nominated)
2021, Phoebe Bridgers, ‘Kyoto’ - Best Rock Song (nominated)
2019, Mitski, ‘Be The Cowboy’ - Best Recording Package (nominated)

A2IM LIBERA AWARDS
2019, Dead Oceans – Label of the Year (finalist)
2019, Phosphorescent, ‘C’est La Vie’ - Best Country/Americana Album (finalist)
2019, Khruangbin, ‘Con Todo El Mundo’’ - Best Outlier Album (WON)
2019, Mitski, ‘Be The Cowboy’ - Album of the Year (finalist)
2019, Mitski – Best Live Act (finalist)
2019, Mitski, ‘Be The Cowboy’ - Best Rock Album (finalist)
2019, Shame, ‘Songs of Praise - Best Rock Album (finalist)
2019, Durand Jones & The Indications, ‘Durand Jones & The Indications’ - Best R&B Album (finalist)
2019, Mitski, ‘Be The Cowboy’ - Creative Packaging (finalist)
2019, Khruangbin, ‘Con Todo El Mundo’ - Marketing Genius (finalist)
2019, Mitski, ‘Nobody’ - Video of the Year (WON)
2018, Dead Oceans – Label of the Year (WON)
2018, Slowdive, ‘Slowdive’ - Album of the Year (WON)
2018, Phoebe Bridgers, ‘Stranger in the Alps’ - Best American Roots & Folk Album (finalist)
2018, Kevin Morby, ‘City Music’ - Best American Roots & Folk Album (finalist)
2018, Slowdive – Marketing Genius (finalist)
2017, Mitski, ‘Your Best American Girl’ - Video of the Year (finalist)
2017, Ryley Walker, ‘Golden Sings That Have Been Sung’ - Best Country/Americana/Folk Album (finalist)
2014, Phosphorescent, ‘Muchacho’ - Album of the Year (finalist)
2013, Bear In Heaven, ‘I Love You, It’s Cool’ - Light Bulb Marketing Award (finalist)

AIM INDEPENDENT MUSIC AWARDS (UK)
2019, Better Oblivion Community Center, ‘s/t’ - Best Independent Album (nominated)
2018, Dead Oceans – Independent Label of the Year (nominated)
2018, Shame, ‘Songs of Praise’ - Album of the Year (nominated)
2018, Phoebe Bridgers, ‘Stranger in the Alps’ - Album of the Year (nominated)
2018, Shame, ‘One Rizla’ - Track of the Year (nominated)
2018, Phoebe Bridgers, ‘Motion Sickness’ - Track of the Year (nominated)
2018, Phoebe Bridgers – International Breakthrough (WON)
2014, Secretly Group – Independent Label of the Year (nominated)

NME AWARDS (UK)
2018, Shame – Best New Artist (nominated)

GRAMMIS AWARDS (SWEDEN)
2011, Tallest Man on Earth – Male Artist of the Year (nominated)

VUT VIA AWARDS (GERMANY)
2018, Slowdive – Best Album (nominated)

See also
List of record labels
Secretly Canadian
Jagjaguwar

References

External links
Dead Oceans official website

 
American independent record labels
Indie rock record labels
Alternative rock record labels
Record labels established in 2007
Indie pop record labels